Fabien Lamirault (born 17 March 1980) is a French para table tennis player.

He has won three world titles, three European titles and two Paralympic titles in para table tennis, he has won team titles with Stephane Molliens and Jean-François Ducay. Lamirault became a quadriplegic in 1998 after a car accident and he started playing table tennis during his rehabilitation.

References

External links 
 
 

1980 births
Living people
French male table tennis players
Paralympic table tennis players of France
Medalists at the 2012 Summer Paralympics
Medalists at the 2016 Summer Paralympics
Table tennis players at the 2012 Summer Paralympics
Table tennis players at the 2016 Summer Paralympics
Paralympic medalists in table tennis
Paralympic gold medalists for France
Paralympic silver medalists for France
Paralympic bronze medalists for France
Table tennis players at the 2020 Summer Paralympics
21st-century French people
20th-century French people